Nissan Versa is an automobile nameplate used by the Japanese manufacturer Nissan in the Americas for the following models:

According to a Nissan press release in 2008, "versa" is short for "versatile space" meant to imply the spaciousness of the interior and configurable cargo arrangements. The Versa is one of the few remaining subcompact cars left on sale in the North American market, with most automakers dropping small cars from their lineups to focus on crossovers and SUVs.

Sales

References 

Versa
Subcompact cars
Vehicles with CVT transmission